Markku Peltoniemi (born 8 February 1948) is a Finnish former footballer and a current sporting director for Helsingin Jalkapalloklubi

Career
Peltoniemi grew up in Töölö area in Helsinki and joined Helsingin Jalkapalloklubi, the club he supported, as a 12 years old, youngest possible youth team at the time. He went through HJK youth teams and was promoted to first team in 1965 season. In he's first season he scored against Manchester United in a European cup tie. He spend 11 seasons playing for HJK in Finnish top flight mestaruussarja before being released from the club. For three seasons in 1976-1978 he played for another local club Helsingin Palloseura in first and second division before a single season in Vantaan Pallo.

In 1980 he started as a sporting director for HJK and has hold that position for over 40 years.

As an amateur footballer, alongside he's football career Peltoniemi also worked in banking industry.

He earned 5 caps for Finland's youth national teams.

Honours

as a player
Finnish Championship: 1973
Finnish Cup: 1966

as a sporting director
Finnish Championship: 1981, 1985, 1987, 1988, 1990, 1992, 1997, 2002, 2003, 2009, 2010, 2011, 2012, 2013, 2014, 2017, 2018, 2020
Finnish Cup: 1981, 1984, 1993, 1996, 1998, 2000, 2003, 2006, 2008, 2011, 2014, 2016–17, 2020

References

Living people
1948 births
Footballers from Helsinki
Helsingin Jalkapalloklubi players
Association football midfielders
Finnish footballers